Park Rynie is a small resort town on the South Coast of KwaZulu-Natal in South Africa. It was established in 1857 and possibly named after Renetta (nicknamed Rynie) Hoets, wife of one of the John Phillip Hoffman, partner in the firm Nosworthy & Co. that bought the original farm for development. There was a whaling station here built during World War I, Park Rynie Whales Ltd. A breakwater, Rocky Bar Pier and a landing ramp were also built. Neighboring towns and settlements include Scottburgh, Rocky Bay,  Pennington, and Umzinto.

Indian South Africans are the single largest population group in Park Rynie.

The main attraction of this town is the quaint beaches. They have an interesting geological and historical value.

References

Populated places in the Umdoni Local Municipality
Populated coastal places in South Africa
1857 establishments in Africa
KwaZulu-Natal South Coast